Nanowood is heat-insulating material made from wood that is considered a slightly better insulator than Styrofoam. Unlike Styrofoam, the material is more environmentally friendly and biodegradable. It is considered light, strong and created entirely from stripped-down wood fibers.

Design
The material was invented by engineer, Liangbing Hu and his team at University of Maryland, College Park. The material "when exposed to the solar spectrum" reflected approximately 95% of radiation energy absorbing only approximately 2%. Silica aerogel "absorbed approximately 20% and transmits approximately 60% of the radiative heat" according to study authors. Nanowood could potentially save "billions in energy costs" according to Tian Li, a team member.

See also 

 Transparent wood composites

References

2018 in technology
American inventions
Organic polymers
Sustainable technologies